Xenocypris yunnanensis, the Kunming nase, is a species of ray-finned fish in the genus Xenocypris. It is endemic to Lake Dianchi in Yunnan Province, China. The species started to decline in the 1970s and has not been caught in the lake after two specimens were collected in 1985; it may be extinct. Its demise is likely due to introduced fish species, grass carp. It was also impacted by over-fishing and pollution. They grow to a maximum length of 23 cm (9 inches). They are dark grayish with a silvery white belly, gray dorsal fin, reddish anal fin and orange red caudal fin.  They have a rounded belly, blunt snout, eyes on the lateral of their heads, small and transverse mouth.

References

Xenocyprinae
Cyprinid fish of Asia
Endemic fauna of Yunnan
Freshwater fish of China
Taxa named by John Treadwell Nichols
Fish described in 1925